Richard Levernier is an American nuclear whistleblower.

Levernier worked for 23 years as a nuclear security professional, and identified security problems at U.S. nuclear facilities as part of his job. Specifically, after 9/11, he identified problems with contingency planning to protect US nuclear plants from terrorist attacks. He said that the assumption that attackers would both enter and exit from facilities was not valid, since suicide terrorists would not need to exit. In response to this complaint, the U.S. Department of Energy withdrew Levernier's security clearance and he was assigned to clerical work. Levernier approached the United States Office of Special Counsel (OSC), which handles US federal whistleblower matters. It took the OSC four years to vindicate Levernier, ruling that the department's retaliation was illegal – but the OSC could not reinstate Levernier's security clearance, so he was unable to regain work in nuclear security.

See also
List of nuclear whistleblowers
Nuclear safety
George Galatis
Nuclear whistleblowers
Vulnerability of nuclear plants to attack

References

American whistleblowers
Nuclear terrorism
Year of birth missing (living people)
Living people